"I'm an Old Cowhand (From the Rio Grande)" is a comic song written by Johnny Mercer for the Paramount Pictures release Rhythm on the Range and sung by its star, Bing Crosby.  The Crosby commercial recording was made on July 17, 1936, with Jimmy Dorsey & his Orchestra for Decca Records.  It was a huge hit in 1936, reaching the No. 2 spot in the charts of the day, and it greatly furthered Mercer's career. Crosby recorded the song again in 1954 for his album Bing: A Musical Autobiography. 
Members of the Western Writers of America chose it as one of the Top 100 Western songs of all time.

Background
Mercer and his wife were driving across the US en route to his hometown, Savannah, Georgia, after having apparently failed to succeed in Hollywood. Mercer was amused by the sight of cowboys, with spurs and ten-gallon hats, driving cars and trucks instead of riding horses. Singing cowboys were popular in films and on the radio then, and within 15 minutes, writing on the back of an envelope, Mercer transferred the image he was seeing into a song whose satirical lyrics vented some of his own bitter frustration with Hollywood.

The lyrics, about a 20th-century cowboy who has little in common with the cowpunchers of old, have been included in some anthologies of light verse.

Other recordings
The song has also been sung by Roy Rogers (Sons of the Pioneers), Sophia Johnson, Carson Robison, Bobby Darin, Tex Ritter, The Mills Brothers, Johnnie Ray, Jack Teagarden, Patsy Montana, Frank Sinatra, Steve Lawrence, Lorne Greene, Dan Hicks, and Harry Connick Jr., Hotclub of Cowtown among others. A notable jazz version by Sonny Rollins leads off his 1957 album Way Out West. Instrumental versions were done by Ray Conniff on his album 'S Wonderful! (1956) and Herb Alpert and the Tijuana Brass on their album The Brass are Comin''' (1969).
Another jazz version was recorded by UK jazz artist Acker Bilk.

Film and other appearances
1936 Rhythm on the Range - performed by Bing Crosby, Leonid Kinskey, Martha Raye, Bob Burns, and Louis Prima, accompanied by The Sons of the Pioneers in a campfire scene.
1940 Me Feelins is Hurt - a western-themed Popeye cartoon, as background music
1943 King of the Cowboys - sung by Roy Rogers.
1947 The Mild West, a Paramount Noveltoon, in a bouncing ball sequence
1954 I Love Lucy - sung by Lucille Ball and Vivian Vance in the season 3 episode "Home Movies".
1987 Innerspace - Robert Picardo performs a verse.
2012 Men in Black 3 - The Sons of the Pioneers version is heard.

References

 Who Wrote that Song'' by Dick Jacobs & Harriet Jacobs, published by Writer's Digest Books 1993 (2nd Edition)

External links

Songs about cowboys and cowgirls
Western music (North America)
Songs with lyrics by Johnny Mercer
Songs written by Johnny Mercer
1936 songs